Agatha Baas-Jansen, or better known as Ada Jansen, (born 5 July 1942) is a Dutch police officer and politician.

Career
Jansen was in the police in Nijmegen when she became interested in the care of those with mental disabilities and undertook related studies. Until 1980 she was in the Anti-Revolutionary Party, but on 11 October she joined the Christian Democratic Appèl.

From May 1988 to September 1989, she was elected to the House of Representatives. She assisted with  police related matters, emancipation, minorities and in particular with that of Chinese people in the Netherlands.

Personal life
Her husband, Dick Baas, was an alderman of Nunspeet.

References

1942 births
Living people
20th-century Dutch women politicians
20th-century Dutch politicians
Christian Democratic Appeal politicians
People from Nijmegen
Members of the House of Representatives (Netherlands)
Dutch police officers